Chrysoteuchia distinctellus is a moth in the family Crambidae. It was described by John Henry Leech in 1889. It is found in Japan and Russia.

References

Crambini
Moths described in 1889
Moths of Japan
Moths of Asia